Šišmundo (Šiško) Gundulić, also Sigismondo Gondola, (c. July 1634– September 16, 1682) was a nobleman and poet from the Republic of Ragusa. He was the son of poet Ivan Gundulić and Nika Sorkočević, and brother of the Austrian Marshal Fran Dživo Gundulić. He served as a Rector of the Republic of Ragusa (Dubrovnik).

Biography 

Following the footsteps of his father, Croatian poet Ivan Gundulić, he also composed diverse poetry, poetry of both father and son was distinguished by the same similar elegance, some of their works were translated in the L´Epithalame de Catulle, other great musical works in 1662 Sunčanica. His first wife is unknown but he remarried with Katarina de Nale and had four children, Fran Gundulić II k.k General der Cav., Dživo Šiškov Gundulić (c. 1678 – c. 1721), Hieronymus Gundulić and Šiško Frano Gundulić II (*1682 + 1758) was one of the founders the first Austrian Lodge Zu den drei in Vienna 17 September 1742, on 7 March 1743 became Master of the Lodge Zu den drei Kanonen of Freemasonry. Šišmundo married Pier An. Crijević and had the last Gundulić male line, Šiško Dominko Gundulić, the daughter Katarina Gundulić married with Matej Getaldić, continued with the surname Getaldić-Gundulić, by adoption for the son of Katarina, Frano Augustin Getaldić-Gundulić.

He was also known by his bad habits, his public addiction to alcohol and his public scandals in the city of Dubrovnik. Šiško died in the Sponza Palace (Rector's Palace) in 1682.

See also

 Republic of Ragusa
 List of notable Ragusans
 Trpanj
 House of Gundulić
 Ivan Gundulić
 Dživo Šiškov Gundulić
 Fran Dživo Gundulić
 Frano Getaldić-Gundulić

External links
Biography in the Croatian Biographical Lexicon (in Croatian)
Short biography (in Croatian)

1634 births
1682 deaths
17th-century Croatian poets
People from the Republic of Ragusa
Sismundo
Ragusan poets
Croatian male poets
17th-century male writers